Stuart Lancaster may refer to:

Stuart Lancaster (actor), American actor
Stuart Lancaster (rugby union), English rugby union coach